Marko Tuulola (born 7 February 1971) is a retired Finnish professional ice hockey defenceman.

Career
Tuulola played in the SM-liiga for HPK, Lukko and Jokerit. He also played in the Swedish Elitserien for Brynäs IF and in the Swiss Nationalliga A for SC Rapperswil-Jona Lakers. In 2003, he won the Pekka Rautakallio trophy for the best defenceman in the SM-liiga.

Tuulola was a member of the Finland national team for the 2002 IIHF World Championship.

Career statistics

Regular season and playoffs

International

Achievements
 Pekka Rautakallio trophy for best defenseman in the SM-liiga - 2003

References

External links

1971 births
People from Hämeenlinna
EHC Basel players
Brynäs IF players
Finnish ice hockey defencemen
Jokerit players
HPK players
Lukko players
Living people
SC Rapperswil-Jona Lakers players
Sportspeople from Kanta-Häme